Métis-sur-Mer is a city in the La Mitis Regional County Municipality within the Bas-Saint-Laurent region of Quebec, Canada. It had a population of 587 in the Canada 2016 Census.

Etymology
The name "Métis" is said to come from a Mi'kmaq word meaning "meeting place"; "sur-mer" refers to its location on the Saint Lawrence River.

History

From 1818, John MacNider, the Scottish Seigneur of Métis started settling the area with Scottish immigrants.

The city has a borough named MacNider, named after John MacNider family, whose territory corresponds to the former (pre-merger) village municipality of Métis-sur-Mer.(Metis Beach)

The town was a popular summer vacation spot for wealthy anglophone Montrealers. At the end of the 19th century, they spent their time in Métis-sur-Mer to flee waves of cholera. At the beginning of the 20th century, they did so again to escape outbreaks of the Spanish flu.

On July 4, 2002, the village of Métis-sur-Mer and the municipality of Les Boules merged to form the city of Métis-sur-Mer.

Demographics 

Population
Population trend:

See also
 List of cities in Quebec

References

External links
 

Metis-sur-Mer
Incorporated places in Bas-Saint-Laurent